Indian Camp is a short story written by Ernest Hemingway.

Indian Camp may also refer to:

Indian Camp Hollow, a valley in Tennessee